The Texas District Courts form part of the Texas judicial system and are the trial courts of general jurisdiction of Texas. As of January 2019, 472 district courts serve the state, each with a single judge, elected by partisan election to a four-year term.  

District courts have original jurisdiction in all felony criminal cases, divorce cases, land title disputes, election contests, civil matters in which at least $200 is disputed or claimed in damages, as well as other matters. Most district courts consider both criminal and civil cases but, in counties with many courts, each may specialize in civil, criminal, juvenile, or family law matters.

The Texas tradition of one judge per district court is descended from what was the dominant form of American state trial court organization for much of the 19th century, which Texas wrote into its state constitution.  Although the relevant constitutional clause was amended in 1985 to no longer require one judge per court,  the tradition had become thoroughly entrenched. 

Districts can cover a single county or several counties, with many districts overlapping one another. Harris County, the state's most populous, is home to 60 district courts - each one covering the entire county.  While district courts can exercise concurrent jurisdiction over an entire county, and they can and do share courthouses and clerks to save money (as allowed under an 1890 Texas Supreme Court case), each is still legally constituted as a separate court.  This is dramatically different from the situation in most U.S. states (or most other jurisdictions), in which a single trial court is staffed by multiple judges, each of whom has authority to act in the name of that court. 

In sparsely populated areas, a single district can cover numerous counties: several districts span five counties, for example. Some counties share numerous overlapping districts, such as the 12 districts that serve the same 13 county region of central and eastern Texas, with each district covering the entirety of the 13 counties.

Counties containing the most districts
The following data is accurate as of February 2022.

References

External links
Texas District Court information
Map of District Court Jurisdictions

District courts